Luis Aquilino Gonzalez (born July 14, 1980) is an American soccer coach and former player who is currently the head coach of San Jose Earthquakes in MLS.

Youth and college
Gonzalez was born in Hialeah, Florida, to a Peruvian father and an American mother.

Gonzalez represented the United States U17s at the 1997 FIFA U-17 World Championship making 3 appearances in their group stage exit.
He played four years of college soccer at Southern Methodist University, emerging in 2001, his senior season, to win the Hermann Trophy as college soccer's best player. He had 128 points during his career, including 48 goals and 32 assists.

Playing career
Upon graduating, Gonzalez was drafted 6th overall in the 2002 MLS SuperDraft by the San Jose Earthquakes. Gonzalez failed to make a mark with the Earthquakes, however, playing only 47 minutes in his rookie season. In the offseason he was acquired by the Columbus Crew and made the roster, but could not agree to a deal.

He left the United States for Sweden, where he signed with second-division club Bodens BK.  Gonzalez scored 8 goals and had 4 assists in his first season in Europe; along with Leighton O'Brien, Gonzalez was one of the most respected players in the squad. He left Boden in late October 2003. 
Gonzalez joined Peruvian Sporting Cristal, where he was acquired to be a backup striker. Gonzalez appeared in the prestigious Copa Libertadores tournament, playing against the likes of Boca Juniors during his time.

Gonzalez came back to MLS in 2005. He signed with the Colorado Rapids, but following the 2006 season he was waived. He signed for Miami FC in 2007.

Coaching career

In December 2018, Gonzalez was named Head Coach of FC Dallas in MLS, earning a promotion from his academy director role. Gonzalez has adopted a style of play dubbed 'Luchi Ball' by fans, emphasizing possession and counter-pressing.

Gonzalez coached Dallas to playoff appearances in 2019 and 2020. On September 19, 2021, he was fired by FC Dallas after missing the playoffs.

On December 4, 2021, Gonzalez was appointed assistant coach of the United States men's national soccer team.<ref name="Luchi Gonzalez Appointed Assistant Coach of U.S. Men’s National Team" 

On August 17, 2022, it was announced that Gonzalez would take over as head coach of the San Jose Earthquakes prior to the start of the 2023 Major League Soccer season. He would officially join the club following the conclusion of the 2022 FIFA World Cup.

Coaching statistics

See also
 List of MLS coaches

References

1980 births
Living people
Sportspeople from Miami-Dade County, Florida
Soccer players from Florida
American soccer players
American soccer coaches
United States men's youth international soccer players
American sportspeople of Peruvian descent
Colorado Rapids players
Sporting Cristal footballers
San Jose Earthquakes players
Miami FC (2006) players
Minnesota Thunder players
Bodens BK players
USL First Division players
SMU Mustangs men's soccer players
Major League Soccer players
San Jose Earthquakes draft picks
FC Dallas non-playing staff
Hermann Trophy men's winners
All-American men's college soccer players
American expatriate soccer players
Association football forwards
FC Dallas coaches
Expatriate footballers in Sweden
Expatriate footballers in Peru
American expatriate sportspeople in Sweden
American expatriate sportspeople in Peru
People from Hialeah, Florida